This is a list of the butterflies of family Pieridae, or the "whites", which are found in Sri Lanka. It is part of the List of butterflies of Sri Lanka.

Subfamily Pierinae, whites

Genus Cepora, gulls

Genus Delias, Jezebels

Genus Prioneris, sawtooths

Genus Appias, puffins and albatrosses

Genus Leptosia, Psyche

Genus Ixias, Indian orange tips

Genus Hebomoia, great orange tip

Genus Colotis, Arabs

Genus Pareronia, wanderers

Subfamily Coliadinae, yellows

Genus Catopsilia, emigrants

Genus Eurema, grass yellows

References
Bernard d'Abrera (1986) Butterflies of the Oriental Region. Part 1: Papilionidae, Pieridae and Danaidae Hill House Publishers 
D'Abrera, B.L. (1998) The Butterflies of Ceylon. Hill House: Melbourne; London. 224 pp. 

Lists of butterflies of Sri Lanka
Pieridae